Adam Kersten (26 April 1930 in Kutno -  11 January 1983 in Warsaw) was a Polish historian, expert on the Polish history in the 17th century. Member of the faculty at Maria Curie-Skłodowska University since 1955.

From 1980 he was active in the Solidarity movement.

Husband of Krystyna Kersten.

Posthumously he received the Order of Polonia Restituta.

Works
 Opowieści o szwedzkim najeździe (1956)
 Chłopi polscy w walce z najazdem szwedzkim 1655 - 1656 (1958)
 Z badań nad konfederacją tyszowiecką (1958)
 Geneza nowej gigantomachii (1958)
 Pierwszy opis obrony Jasnej Góry w 1655 r. (1959)
 Stefan Czarniecki 1599-1665 (1963)
 Obrona Klasztoru w Jasnej Górze (1964)
 Sienkiewicz – „Potop” – Historia (1966)
 Historia dla klasy II liceum ogólnokształcacego (1968)
 Na tropach Napierskiego. W kręgu mitów i faktów (1970)
 Warszawa Kazimierowska 1648-1668: miasto, ludzie, polityka (1971)
 Historia Szwecji (1973)
 Szwedzi pod Jasną Górą 1655 (1975)
 Historia powszechna, 1648-1789 (1978)
 Historia powszechna, wiek XVII (1984)
 Hieronim Radziejowski: studium władzy i opozycji (1988)

References
 Adam Kersten page on his memorial foundation
 Biography
 Jerzy Jedlicki, Adam Kersten: Suwerenność historyka, „Gazeta Wyborcza”, 13.01.2008 (mirror).

1930 births
1983 deaths
Polish dissidents
20th-century Polish historians
Polish male non-fiction writers
Recipients of the Order of Polonia Restituta
Solidarity (Polish trade union) activists
Historians of Poland
University of Warsaw alumni